Jason McCoy is the second album by Canadian country music singer Jason McCoy.

Track listing

 "Country Side" (Jason McCoy) – 3:54
 "This Used to Be Our Town" (Denny Carr, McCoy, Chris Lindsey) – 3:46
 "Learning a Lot About Love" (Terrine Barnes, McCoy) – 3:35
 "Candle" (McCoy, Barnes) – 3:07
 "I Know How to Love You" (McCoy, Lindsey) – 3:00
 "Take It from Me" (McCoy) – 3:33
 "Fastest Man Alive" (McCoy) – 4:46
 "All the Way" (McCoy, Lindsey) – 4:18
 "Ghosts" (McCoy) – 4:18
 "Your Mama Warned You 'Bout Me" (McCoy) – 3:16
 "Cornelia" (McCoy, Carr) – 2:48

Chart performance

Jason McCoy albums
1995 albums
MCA Records albums